

Events

January
  9 January – Shenyang Metro Line 2 opened.
  14 January – The Marina Bay Extension of the Circle MRT Line in Singapore opens for service.

February
  4 February – National Express East Anglia's passenger service franchise expires; from the following day services are taken over by Abellio Greater Anglia.
  22 February – Buenos Aires rail disaster: A buffer stop collision at Once railway station kills 51.

March
  3 March – Szczekociny rail crash: A head-on collision in Poland kills 16.
  25 March – The north shore connector extension of the Pittsburgh Light Rail system opens.

April
  13 April – The Metropolitan Transportation Commission (San Francisco Bay Area) grants the Downtown San Francisco Extension top priority for federal funding. This would extend the Caltrain line  from the current terminus at 4th & King (close to AT&T Park) to Downtown San Francisco's Transbay Transit Center and be used by California High-Speed Rail as its terminal.  the extension does not have a planned completion.
  23 April – Boston's MBTA Commuter Rail Providence/Stoughton Line extension to Wickford Junction (MBTA station) opens.
 28 April
  – Open-access operator Nuovo Trasporto Viaggiatori begins operation of its .italo high-speed trains.
  – The first phase of Los Angeles County Metropolitan Transportation Authority Expo Line opens for service. The line runs from downtown LA to Culver City. The next phase of the project will extend the line to Santa Monica.
  – Suzhou Metro opens.
  30 April – Oakton-Skokie station on the Chicago Transit Authority's Yellow Line opens.

May
  27 May – GoRail starts operating on Tallinn–Saint Petersburg line after a four-year hiatus.

June
  13 June – The Manchester Metrolink light rail system opens the first phase of its Oldham & Rochdale Line over the former Oldham Loop Line to a temporary terminus at Oldham Mumps.
  15 June – The Sacramento Regional Transit Light Rail Green Line phase 1 to River District opens. A future extension is planned to extend this line to the Sacramento International Airport but is not expected to be completed until sometime during the 2020s.
  28 June – Kunming Metro opens.

July
  1 July – Tianjin Metro Line 2 opens.
  28 July – Construction was completed and service commencing on the AirportLink line of the Miami Metrorail, extending service to Miami International Airport via the Miami Intermodal Center

August
  27 August – Construction is completed on the north east extension of Calgary Alberta's light rail transit system, the C-Train. The extension has added 2 new stations in northeast Calgary at Martindale and Saddletowne, adding several kilometers of track to the system.
  31 August – Sofia Metro Line 2 begins service.

September
  16 September – Chengdu Metro Line 2 opens.
  22 September – The 2001-opened Portland Streetcar system, in Portland, Oregon, inaugurates service on a second line, the "Central Loop" (or CL Line), serving the central east side. 
  28 September – Phase 1 of Chongqing Rail Transit's Line 6, connecting Wulidian to Kangzhuang, opens.

October
 1 October
  Tianjin Metro Line 3 opens.
  The Nikšić–Podgorica railway reopens to passengers after reconstruction and electrification.
  3 October – The UK Department for Transport announces cancellation and rerunning of the InterCity West Coast passenger service franchise bidding process after discovering significant technical flaws in its assessment, reversing an August decision to award it to FirstGroup and following challenges by incumbent operator Virgin Trains.
  8 October – Seattle's Sounder commuter rail south line extension to South Tacoma and Lakewood opens.
  29 October – Dar es Salaam commuter rail service commences.

November
  24 November – Hangzhou Metro Line 3 opens.

December
  1 December – The Harbin–Dalian High-Speed Railway opens for service.
  3 December – Dallas Area Rapid Transit opens extensions on two lines: the Orange Line carrying passengers to Belt Line, and the Blue Line extension to the Downtown Rowlett Station.
 10 December
  – Opening of West Line of the Calgary C-Train, the system's first new line in 25 years.
  – Utah Transit Authority's FrontRunner extends service south from Salt Lake City to Provo.
  15 December – Automation of Paris Métro Line 1 reaches 100%. This is the second automated line after Line 14.
  16 December – The Manchester Metrolink light rail system extends its Oldham & Rochdale Line to Shaw & Crompton.
  21 December – Inauguration of the reopened Nigerian Railway Corporation's Lagos–Kano railway line in Nigeria, rebuilt by China Civil Engineering Construction Corporation and Costain West Africa.
  26 December – The Beijing-Zhengzhou section of the Beijing–Guangzhou–Shenzhen–Hong Kong High-Speed Railway is scheduled to open, completing the HSR connection from Beijing to Guangzhou and Shenzhen.

Deaths 
 18 March – Alan Pegler, British railway preservationist, dies (b. 1920).
 22 July – Ding Guangen, Minister of Railways for China 1985–1988, dies (b. 1929).
 5 August – Benjamin W. Heineman, president of Chicago and North Western Railway 1956–1972, dies (b. 1914).
 4 October – Bernard Holden, president of Bluebell Railway, dies (b. 1908).

Industry awards

Japan 
 Awards presented by the Japan Railfan Club
 2012 Blue Ribbon Award: JR East E5 Series Shinkansen EMU
 2012 Laurel Prize: JR Freight Class HD300-900 hybrid locomotive

References

See also 
 List of rail accidents (2010–2019)